Thomas Henry Hellyer (18405 April 1889) was an Australian politician and solicitor.

He was born at Bathurst to solicitor William Hellyer, and Margaret  Gray. On 25 April 1862 he married Rose Anne Parfitt, with whom he had twelve children. A solicitor, he practised from 1867, first in Sydney, then in Parramatta from 1869, Bathurst from 1878, and Sydney again from 1885, sharing the same Sydney premises as his father.

He was the mayor of Bathurst for 1880, and 1881.

In 1882 he was a candidate for the New South Wales Legislative Assembly. He stood for Bathurst at the election on Saturday 2 December, but was narrowly defeated with a margin of 16 votes (1.6 %), but was elected unopposed for the neighbouring district of West Macquarie the following week. He resigned in 1884 for unknown reasons.

Hellyer had a cancer removed, however it returned in December 1888, and he died at Liverpool in 1889 (aged 49).

References

 

1840 births
1889 deaths
Members of the New South Wales Legislative Assembly
19th-century Australian politicians
Mayors of Bathurst, New South Wales